West Nanjing Road Station is a virtual interchange station between Lines 2, 12 and 13 of the Shanghai Metro, located along one of Shanghai's main commercial streets, with a number of international flagship stores situated nearby. The station changed into its current name in October 2006 according to the new convention to name metro stations after famous streets or sights nearby rather than the vertical street neighbouring the station, making it easier for visitors to find these places.

The connection with lines 12 and 13 opened on 19 December 2015. At present it is a virtual interchange station meaning passengers need to exit the station to transfer to other lines and only those with 1- or 3-day passes or Shanghai Public Transport Cards (SPTC) are not charged for such transfers, provided SPTC users transfer within 30 minutes. The station is planned to become a physical interchange station in the upcoming years.

Places Nearby
 Nanjing Road (W.) shopping street
 Shanghai Natural History Museum
 Jing An Sculpture Park
 Taixing Road Zhang's Garden
 Shanghai Centre

References

Shanghai Metro stations in Jing'an District
Line 2, Shanghai Metro
Line 12, Shanghai Metro
Line 13, Shanghai Metro
Railway stations in China opened in 1999